On Conan Doyle; or, The Whole Art of Storytelling is a 2011 book about Arthur Conan Doyle by Michael Dirda. Published by Princeton University Press on 10 October 2011, it later went on to win the Edgar Award for Best Critical / Biographical Works in 2012.

References 

2011 non-fiction books
Edgar Award-winning works
Princeton University Press books